Colonel Meow (October 11, 2011 – January 29, 2014) was an American Himalayan–Persian crossbreed cat, who temporarily held the 2014 Guinness world record for the longest fur on a cat (nine inches or about 23 cm). He became an Internet celebrity when his owners posted pictures of his scowling face to Facebook and Instagram. He was lovingly known by his hundreds of thousands of followers as an "adorable fearsome dictator", a "prodigious Scotch drinker" and "the angriest cat in the world".

Background
Colonel Meow was rescued by Seattle Persian and Himalayan Rescue and was later adopted at a Petco by his owner Anne Avey. He rose to internet fame after his owner posted a picture of his angry-looking scowl to Facebook and Instagram.

Health complications and death
In November 2013, Colonel Meow was hospitalized due to heart problems and underwent a difficult surgery and blood transfusion. On January 30, 2014, his owner announced on Facebook that Colonel Meow had died. She also expressed gratitude for the support of his more than 350,000 followers.

In July 2014, Friskies posted an ad entitled "Cat Summer" and announced that for each view they would donate one meal to needy cats in Colonel Meow's name. The video stars Grumpy Cat as well as other famous internet cats.

See also
Lil Bub
List of individual cats

Notes

References

External links
Colonel Meow in Guinness World Records 2014

Colonel Meow #10 of 101 Best Instagram Cats to Follow and Love

2014 animal deaths
American Internet celebrities
Animals on the Internet
Biological records
Cats in popular culture
Guinness World Records
Individual cats in the United States
Internet memes about cats
Male mammals
World record holders